Hipparchia tewfiki is a butterfly in the family Nymphalidae. It is found in south-western Saudi Arabia and Yemen.

References

Hipparchia (butterfly)
Butterflies described in 1949